Mladen Vilotijević (born March 22, 1935) is a Serbian academic and author. He is a member of the Serbian Academy of Education (Српска академија образовања). He has three children: Vesna Vilotijević, Goran Vilotijević and Viktor Vilotijević.

See also
Vilotijević

References

1935 births
Living people
20th-century Serbian writers
Serbian academics
People from Bajina Bašta
Serbian educators